The Type 11 Surface-to-Air Missile or Tan-SAM Kai II is a Japanese developed surface-to-air missile currently in service with the Japan Self-Defense Forces.

Development
The system was developed by Toshiba as a further improvement of the Type 81 Surface-to-Air Missile. Development work on Tan-SAM Kai II started in 2005 and in 2014 Type 11 missile was officially unveiled.

Deployment
The system is currently deployed by the Japan Ground Self-Defense Force and Japan Air Self-Defense Force.

The AESA radar and fire control system is carried on a Isuzu Type 73 6×6 truck. In JGSDF service the four-tube missile launcher is also carried on a separate Type 73 truck, while in JASDF service a Toyota Mega Cruiser 4×4 is used instead.

Surface-to-air missiles of Japan